Cold Courage is an international crime-drama series based on the Studio book series and named after the first installment by Pekka Hiltunen. The 8 episodes were available on Viaplay on 3 May 2020.

Premise
The series follows two Finnish women in London who become involved in a secret organisation.

Cast

Main
Sofia Pekkari as Lia
Pihla Viitala as Mari
John Simm as Arthur Fried
Arsher Ali DCI Peter Chandra
Peter Coonan as Paddy
Jakob Eklund as Berg
Caroline Goodall as Maggie
Matteo Simoni as Rico

Recurring
Antti Reini as Vanags
Ian Gerard Whyte as Sean Duffy
Saar de Groof as Yalda
Elmer Bäck as Matti
Venetia Bowe as Katya
Keith McErlean as DS Jason Briggs
Pääru Oja as David Vervloet
Megan O'Kelly as Anya
Toni O'Rourke as Nina
Charlotte Timmers as Annabelle Fried
Maria Doyle Kennedy as Suzie Hawkins
David Fawaz as Mohammad Latif
Aislín McGuckin as Toni Gallagher
Derek Ugochukwu as Abu Al Jabar
Jussi Nikkilä as Aarne
Rea Mauranen as Mamia
Jack Bandeira as Monty
Danielle Galligan as Daiga Mednis
Matti Onnismaa as Mikael

Episodes

Production
In May 2017, it was announced Viaplay and Sagafilm had picked up the Studio series, the first book titled Cold Courage, by Pekka Hiltunen. Luminoir's Markku Flink would produce, and David Joss Buckley and Brendan Foley would adapt the story for screen. The series is internationally co-produced by Finnish, Irish, Belgian, and Icelandic production companies Luminoir, Vico Films, Potemkino, and Sagafilm respectively.

Casting was announced in January 2019 as principal photography for the series began, taking place in London, Dublin, Antwerp, Helsinki, and Kainuu.

Release
A trailer was released on 6 April 2020. The series was available in Nordic countries on Viaplay on 3 May 2020.

Global Road Entertainment originally had the rights to distribute the series internationally before pulling out; Lionsgate are now in charge of international distribution.

In August 2020, it was announced the series would premiere on BritBox in the UK on 3 September.

Cold Courage premiered on AMC+ in the United States on March 11, 2021.

References

External links
 

2020 British television series debuts
2020 British television series endings
2020 Irish television series debuts
2020 Belgian television series debuts
2020 Finnish television series debuts
2020s crime drama television series
Television series based on novels
Works based on Finnish works